WCMR-FM (94.5 FM) was a radio station formerly licensed to Bruce, Mississippi, United States. The station was owned by Horizon Christian Fellowship.

History
The station went on the air as WCMR on 1994-02-22. On 2008-06-16, the station slightly changed its call sign to WCMR-FM. On May 4, 2012, the station surrendered its license to the Federal Communications Commission, and the station's license was cancelled and its call sign deleted from the FCC's database on May 24, 2012.

References

External links

Defunct religious radio stations in the United States
CMR-FM
Radio stations disestablished in 2012
Defunct radio stations in the United States
Radio stations established in 1994
1994 establishments in Mississippi
2012 disestablishments in Mississippi
CMR-FM